Nafrat (Hatred) is a 1973 Bollywood romance film directed by Shyam Ralhan. The film stars Rakesh Roshan and Yogeeta Bali.

Cast
Rakesh Roshan as Prakash Kumar 
Yogeeta Bali as Kiran 
Bindu as Ashoo Kumar 
Premnath as CBI Inspector Kumar 
Prem Chopra as Mohan 
Madan Puri
Faryal as Dolly 
Rajendra Nath as Pyarelal 
Amrit Patel   
Krishan Dhawan   
Chandrashekhar as Shekhar 
Bharat Kapoor as Kishan 
Sunder as Sunder Sharma 
Yunus Parvez   
Raju Shrestha as Young Prakash

Soundtrack
All songs were written by Majrooh Sultanpuri.

References

External links
 

1973 films
1970s Hindi-language films
1970s romance films
Films scored by R. D. Burman

Indian romance films
Hindi-language romance films